An N-jet is the set of (partial) derivatives of a function  up to order N.

For example, algorithms for tasks such as feature detection, feature classification, stereo matching, tracking and object recognition can be expressed in terms of N-jets computed at one or several scales in scale space.

See also 
 Scale space implementation
 Jet (mathematics)

References

Computer vision
Image processing